Gustavo Claudio da Silva (born 20 August 1988), commonly known as Gustavo, is a Brazilian professional footballer who plays for Kasuka FC of the Brunei Super League as a midfielder.

Career
In 2020, Gustavo joined Thai League 3 club Nakhon Si United.

Career statistics

Club

Notes

References

1988 births
Living people
Brazilian footballers
Brazilian expatriate footballers
Association football midfielders
Hong Kong Premier League players
Thai League 1 players
Bangu Atlético Clube players
Citizen AA players
Associação Esportiva Velo Clube Rioclarense players
Friburguense Atlético Clube players
Goytacaz Futebol Clube players
Yuen Long FC players
Thai Honda F.C. players
Pembroke Athleta F.C. players
Brazilian expatriate sportspeople in Costa Rica
Brazilian expatriate sportspeople in Hong Kong
Brazilian expatriate sportspeople in Thailand
Brazilian expatriate sportspeople in Malta
Brazilian expatriate sportspeople in Brunei
Expatriate footballers in Costa Rica
Expatriate footballers in Hong Kong
Expatriate footballers in Thailand
Expatriate footballers in Malta
Expatriate footballers in Brunei
Nakhon Si United F.C. players
People from Cantagalo, Rio de Janeiro